Poland is scheduled to compete at the 2024 Summer Olympics in Paris from 26 July to 11 August 2024, celebrating the centenary of the team's debut in the same venue. Polish athletes have appeared in every edition of the Summer Olympic Games from 1924 onwards, except for Los Angeles 1984 as part of the Soviet boycott.

Competitors
The following is the list of number of competitors in the Games.

Shooting

Polish shooters achieved quota places for the following events based on their results at the 2022 and 2023 ISSF World Championships, 2022, 2023, and 2024 European Championships, 2023 European Games, and 2024 ISSF World Olympic Qualification Tournament, if they obtained a minimum qualifying score (MQS) from 14 August 2022 to 9 June 2024.

Swimming

Polish swimmers achieved the entry standards in the following events for Paris 2024 (a maximum of two swimmers under the Olympic Qualifying Time (OST) and potentially at the Olympic Consideration Time (OCT)):

References

Nations at the 2024 Summer Olympics
2024
2024 in Polish sport